Prateek is an Indian given name. Notable people with this name include:

Prateek Babbar (born 1986), Indian actor mostly in Hindi language films
Prateek Baid, Indian model, actor, automobile engineer and beauty pageant titleholder
Prateek Chaudhuri (1971–2021), Indian classical sitarist of the Senia Gharana (school)
Prateek Jain (born 1994), Indian cricketer
Prateek Kataria (born 1995), Indian cricketer
Prateek Kuhad, Indian singer-songwriter and musician
Prateek Reddy, Indian cricketer
Prateek Sharma (born 1990), Indian television and film producer and director
Prateek Bhushan Singh (born 1988), Indian politician

See also
Jain Prateek Chihna or Jain symbols, symbols based on the Jain philosophy
Dr Bhimrao Ambedkar Samajik Parivartan Prateek Sthal (Ambedkar Memorial Park), a public park and memorial in Gomti Nagar, Lucknow, Uttar Pradesh, India
Prateeksha
Pratique